Steve Hopkins (born June 30, 1962) is an American Republican politician. He is a member of the Mississippi House of Representatives, having represented the state's 7th House district, composed of DeSoto County, since 2016.

Biography 
Steve Hopkins was born on June 30, 1962, in Memphis, Tennessee. He has graduated from Southaven High School, Northwest Mississippi Junior College, and the University of Mississippi. He is a resident of Southaven, Mississippi, and a Quality Assurance team member at FedEx. In 2016, he became a member of the Mississippi House of Representatives, representing Mississippi's 7th House district, composed of DeSoto County.

References 

1962 births
Living people
Republican Party members of the Mississippi House of Representatives
People from Southaven, Mississippi